The Tirupati–Puducherry Weekly Express is an Express train belonging to South Central Railway zone that runs between  and  in India. It is currently being operated with 17413/17414 train numbers on a weekly basis.

Service

The 17413/Tirupati–Puducherry Weekly Express has an average speed of 45 km/hr and covers 303 km in 6h 45m. The 17414/Puducherry–Tirupati Weekly Express has an average speed of 41 km/hr and covers 303 km in 7h 25m.

Route and halts 

The important halts of the train are:

Coach composition

The train has standard ICF rakes with a max speed of 110 kmph. The train consists of 10 coaches:

 8 General Unreserved
 2 Seating cum Luggage Rake
 2 sleeper coaches

Traction

Both trains are hauled by an Arakkonam Loco Shed or Erode Loco Shed-based WAP-4 electric locomotive from Tirupati to Puducherry and vice versa.

Direction reversal

The train reverses its direction 1 times:

See also 

 Tirupati railway station
 Puducherry railway station

Notes

References

External links 

 17413/Tirupati–Puducherry Weekly Express India Rail Info
 17414/Puducherry–Tirupati Weekly Express India Rail Info

Transport in Tirupati
Transport in Puducherry
Express trains in India
Rail transport in Puducherry
Rail transport in Tamil Nadu
Rail transport in Andhra Pradesh
Railway services introduced in 2013